Mycetophila is a genus of fungus gnats in the family Mycetophilidae. There are at least 740 described species in Mycetophila.

See also
 List of Mycetophila species

References

Further reading

External links

 

Mycetophilidae
Articles created by Qbugbot
Sciaroidea genera